St. Alexander Nevsky Cathedral (Hram-pametnik "Sveti Aleksandar Nevski") is a Bulgarian Orthodox cathedral in Sofia, the capital of Bulgaria. Built in Neo-Byzantine style, it serves as the cathedral church of the Patriarch of Bulgaria and it is one of the 50 largest Christian church buildings by volume in the world. It is one of Sofia's symbols and primary tourist attractions. It is among the 10 largest Eastern Orthodox church buildings. It is the largest cathedral in the Balkans. It is believed that up until the year 2000 it was the largest finished Orthodox cathedral.

Architecture
The Alexander Nevsky Cathedral is a cross-domed basilica featuring an emphasized central dome. The roof span of the central nave is  The temple has 12 bells with total weight of 23 tons, the heaviest weighing 12 tons and the lightest . The interior is decorated with Italian marble in various colours, Brazilian onyx, alabaster, and other luxurious materials. The central dome has the Lord's Prayer inscribed around it, with thin gold letters.

Architectural influence
There are many churches in Bulgaria which are smaller copies of St. Alexander Nevsky Cathedral like the temples in the following towns: Valchedram,
Sandanski,
Dolna Mitropoliya, 
Kyustendil,
Kaspichan,
Breznik, Dorkovo village.

Design and construction

The construction of the St. Alexander Nevsky Cathedral started in 1882 (having been planned since 19 February 1879), when the foundation stone was laid, but most of it was built between 1904 and 1912. Saint Alexander Nevsky was a Russian prince. The cathedral was created in honour to the Russian soldiers who died during the Russo-Turkish War of 1877–1878, as a result of which Bulgaria was liberated from Ottoman rule.

The cathedral was designed by Alexander Pomerantsev, aided by Alexander Smirnov and Alexander Yakovlev, as the initial 1884–1885 project of Ivan Bogomolov was radically changed by Pomerantsev. The final design was finished in 1898, and the construction and decoration were done by a team of Bulgarian, Russian, Austro-Hungarian and other European artists, architects and workers, including the aforementioned architects, as well as Petko Momchilov, Yordan Milanov, Haralampi Tachev, Ivan Mrkvička, Vasily Bolotnov, Nikolay Bruni, Alexander Kiselyov, Anton Mitov and many others.

The marble parts and the lighting fixtures were created in Munich, the metal elements for the gates in Berlin, while the gates themselves were manufactured in Karl Bamberg's factory in Vienna, and the mosaics were shipped from Venice.

Name changes
The name of the cathedral was briefly changed to the Sts. Cyril and Methodius Cathedral between 1916 and 1920 (since Bulgaria and Russia belonged to opposing alliances in World War I), but then the initial name was restored. The St. Alexander Nevsky Cathedral was consecrated on 12 September 1924 and in 1955 was declared a cultural monument.

Relics
To the left of the altar is a case displaying relics of Alexander Nevsky, given by the Russian Orthodox Church.  Although the accompanying Bulgarian-language plaque refers simply to "relics" (мощи), the item on display appears to be a piece of a rib.

Museum and market

There is a museum of Bulgarian icons inside the cathedral crypt, part of the National Art Gallery. The church claims that the museum contains the largest collection of Orthodox icons in Europe.

Nearby locations
The cathedral is adjacent to St. Sofia Church, the church for which the city of Sofia is named.  Other notable landmarks in the immediate vicinity of the cathedral are the Monument to the Unknown Soldier, the Bulgarian Academy of Sciences, the National Gallery of Foreign Art, the National Art Academy, the Bulgarian Parliament, a park honoring Ivan Vazov with his monument and gravestone, the Sofia Opera and Ballet, and a park where one can buy handmade textiles, icons, and antiques in a small flea market.

Gallery

See also

List of churches in Sofia
List of large Orthodox cathedrals
List of tallest domes

References

External links

 Old photographs of the Nevsky Cathedral
 Three dimensional rendering of Alexander Nevsky Cathedral (without plugin; in English, Spanish, German)
 3D Laser scanning of Alexander Nevsky Cathedral

20th-century churches in Bulgaria
Cathedrals in Sofia
Bulgarian Orthodox cathedrals
Tourist attractions in Sofia
Churches completed in 1912
20th-century Eastern Orthodox church buildings
Church buildings with domes
Byzantine Revival architecture in Bulgaria
Sofia
1912 establishments in Bulgaria
Religious museums in Bulgaria
Bulgarian Orthodox churches in Sofia